Tōyōchō Station (東陽町駅, Tōyōchō-eki) is a railway station in Kōtō, Tokyo, Japan. Its station number is T-14. The station consists of two side platforms.

Lines
 Tokyo Metro Tozai Line


Station layout

History 
Tōyōchō Station opened on 14 September 1967.

The station facilities were inherited by Tokyo Metro after the privatization of the Teito Rapid Transit Authority (TRTA) in 2004.

References

External links

Tokyo Metro station information

Railway stations in Japan opened in 1967
Stations of Tokyo Metro
Tokyo Metro Tozai Line
Railway stations in Tokyo